The 2021–22 Grasshopper Club Zürich season is the club's first season back in the Swiss Super League, after winning promotion from the Swiss Challenge League. The season started on July 24, 2021. Grasshoppers also participated in the Swiss Cup, losing in the second round.

Review and events

Pre-season
On May 26, Grasshopper Club Zürich announced the appointment of Seyi Olofinjana as the new director of football. It was announced on June 9, 2021, that Giorgio Contini would take over the team as the new head coach, who had coached FC Lausanne-Sport until the end of last season.

Before the start of the season, major personnel changes were made: 
 Portuguese goalkeeper André Moreira joined as new first goalkeeper
 Austrian defender Georg Margreitter joined to lead Grasshopper's defense
 Kosovaran midfielder Amir Abrashi returned to the club as the new captain (Abrashi had played for Grasshopper from 2010 till 2015)
 Slovakian midfielder Christián Herc joined from Wolverhampton
 In an unusual transfer, Japanese international Hayao Kawabe joined to augment the midfield

Furthermore, Toti's loan was extended for one year. Two further players were loaned from Wolverhampton (Bulgarian midfielder Bendegúz Bolla and Colombian forward Leonardo Campana). Campana was acquired to replace Léo Bonatini, who was injured at the end of the last season. Finally, Djibril Diani returned from his loan period at Livingston.

At the end of their loan period Oskar Buur and Connor Ronan returned to Wolverhampton, while Miguel Nóbrega returned to Benfica.

First round
The season began poorly, with a 0–2 home loss to Basel, where Campana scored an own goal. However, the team showed a lot of promise and were able to hold a 0–0 draw against Swiss champions Young Boys in the next game. This game was followed up by their first win, a 3–1 victory over Lausanne-Sport. Campana shot two goals (one by penalty) and Toti shot one.

On 17 August 2021, Noah Loosli was acquired from Lausanne-Sport to bolster the defense. Loosli had played at Grasshopper previously between 2015 and 2018 and had already been part of the youth squad. The first major highlight of the season was the derby against city rivals FC Zürich, the first one since April 2019. Grasshopper started well with a 1–0 lead in the 7th minute by Margreitter, via corner, however Zürich was able to equalize almost immediately. In a back-and-forth game, both teams had their chances at victory, but it was Zürich who managed to eke out the win in the last minute of injury time.

On 1 September 2021, Senegalese forward Kaly Sène was loaned from Basel. In his second game, he was able to secure a victory with two goals in a 3–1 win against Sion (Bolla shot the other goal). He backed up this explosive performance with another two goals in a 5–2 victory. It would be Grasshopper's most goals in one game to date this season, with Léo, Bolla, and Diani supplying the other three goals.

Grasshopper ended the first round in 5th place with 13 points (3 wins, 4 draws, 2 losses) in nine games and a 15-11 goal statistic.

On 18 September 2021, they were eliminated from the Swiss Cup, after a 0–1 loss to FC Thun in the second round of the cup.

Second round
Grasshopper were somewhat able to connect on their good performance of the first round. In the second derby of the season, it was Zürich who grabbed the explosive start, leading 2-0 after only ten minutes. Grasshopper was able to claw their way back into the game, in part thanks to a penalty conceded in the 17th minute, which Léo easily converted. Margreitter and Herc completed the turnaround. In the second half of the game Zürich was able to equalize again for the final 3-3 result. The poor start in the game in this derby was a sign of a worrying trend: in the previous game (1-3 loss to Lausanne-Sport), they had also conceded two goals in the first ten minutes of the game.

Their highest victory this season to date occurred on 5 December 2021, with a 4–0 away win against FC St. Gallen, where Sène scored a hat-trick.

A final highlight of this round would be the final game before the winter break against long time rivals FC Basel. In an exciting game, Basel was able to gain a lead in the last minute of the first half, but Grasshopper did not let this lead last long as Kawabe equalized the game soon after restart. Petar Pusic's goal in the 86th minute looked to be the winner of the game, especially since Basel were decimated due to a red card in the 89th minute, however they were once again upset in the last minute of the game with Basel's 2-2 equalizer.

Grasshoppers went into the winter break in 6th place with 23 points after 18 games, with 10 additional points (2 wins, 4 draws, 3 losses) and 17-15 goals  in nine games (total 32–26).

Winter Break
During the winter break, Toti was recalled to Wolverhampton to help out with personnel shortages, while the Swiss league was still on break. However, he was able to prove himself and his loan period was ended prematurely. Campana's loan period was also ended prematurely. Meanwhile, Diani was transferred to Caen, in the French second league, and defender Aleksandar Cvetković left the club to join FC Aarau in the Swiss Challenge League. Cvetković had barely seen any play this season as his position was taken over by the new defensive lead Margreitter. Grasshoppers also acquired Japanese defender Ayumu Seko, Portuguese defender Tomás Ribeiro, and French goalkeeper Lévi Ntumba. In a curious move, Kawabe was sold to Wolverhampton, but loaned right back. Korean forward Jeong Sang-bin and Portuguese midfielder Bruno Jordão were also loaned from Wolverhampton.

Third round
Grasshoppers started absolutely catastrophically into the new year, managing just one win (2-0 away against Lausanne-Sport) and one draw (2-2 at home against Young Boys, thanks to a last minute equalizer by Bolla), after which five losses in a row saw the team dangerously close to the relegation places in the table. At the end of the round, after 27 games played, they were leading 8th place FC Luzern by only five points. In fact, with only four points in nine games, they were the second worst team of the league since the winter break (only Lausanne-Sport had a worse record). A reaction was desperately necessary, as the relegation spots were dangerously close.

The end of the third round saw them in 7th place with 27 points total and a goal difference of 42-46 (four points and 10-20 goals in nine games).

During this time, Nikola Gjorgjev and Shkelqim Demhasaj were loaned out to FC Schaffhausen and FC Winterthur (both playing in the Swiss Challenge League), respectively.

Fourth round
On 28 March 2022, Colombian forward Brayan Riascos joined the club on loan from Ukrainian FC Metalist Kharkiv for the remainder of the season. This was possible due to the Russian invasion of Ukraine, as a result of which the FIFA allowed foreign players in Ukraine to sign with clubs outside Ukraine until 30 June 2022.

The first game of the fourth round would also be the final derby of the season. Zürich, who were leading the league by a large margin, were the heavy favorites. However, Grasshoppers were able to massively improve upon the poor performances of the previous games and managed a 1–1 draw in snowy conditions. Giotto Morandi, who had only recently returned to the team from a long injury, shot the only goal for Grasshoppers in the 52nd minute. In the next game, they missed the chance to distance themselves further from pursuing Luzern, after giving up a 2–0 lead by half-time to end the game in a 2–2 draw, after receiving another last minute equalizer. On 16 April 2022, they managed to beat Servette FC in a 1–0 away victory, their first win after eight games. Léo had scored a penalty in the 10th minute. On 24 April, the upwards trend continued and they beat Lausanne-Sport 3–1, coming back from a 0–1 deficit at 10 minutes. It was their first home victory since 2 October 2021. Kawabe and an own goal turned the game around, while Bolla put the finishing touch in the last minute of regular time.

In the following three rounds, the team was unable to gain another victory, with two away draws against Basel and Lugano, where they unnecessarily gave up a lead, and a 0–1 loss against direct competitor Sion at home. As a result, before the penultimate match of the season Grasshoppers were only one point ahead of Luzern on the relegation playoff spot in the table. In this home game against St. Gallen, nothing but a victory would do. After largely dominating their guests, Grasshoppers were up 2-0 by half-time, after goals by Loosli and Morandi. After St. Gallen were able to come back into the game, with a penalty conceded by goalie Moreira, Momoh once again raised the score a minute after being subbed on. A disorganized defense and a scuffle in Grasshoppers's penalty box lead to one final goal for St. Gallen, but Grasshoppers were able to hold their lead for a 3–2 victory. Thanks to Luzern dropping points in their game against Young Boys, Grasshoppers had a lead of three points on Luzern. With an eleven-goal advantage, virtual safety of the relegation playoff spot was secured.

In the final game of the season, Grasshoppers suffered their worst defeat, a 0–3 away loss to Young Boys. However, this was only the second defeat in the fourth round, with three wins and four draws in the other games (12-9 goals).

Review
Despite 13 points in the last nine games, Grasshoppers still ended the season in eight place with equal points (40) as FC Luzern in ninth place. Thanks to a better goal difference (-4 vs. -11), they just managed to avoid having to play the relegation playoff. Having achieved their goal to remain in the top flight, the season ultimately can be viewed as a success. With a large number of personnel changes and a new coach this was not a matter of course and Grasshoppers sadly had to struggle, especially in the second half of the season. At season's end, Coach Contini highlighted lacking efficiency in front of the opponent's goal and defensive naïveté throughout the season as the biggest deficits. The latter was particularly notable as the team often were unable to hold a lead to the end of the game and lost a total of 25 points after a lead (resulting in eight draws and 3 losses). Particularly, four goals received in injury time cost them seven points (leading to one loss and three draws) and eleven goals received in the last 15 minutes cost them 18 points (four losses, seven draws).

Fans voted Dominik Schmid as their player of the season. Kaly Sène's second of three goals in the 4–0 away win against FC St. Gallen, a stunning overhead kick after a spot-on cross from Bendegúz Bolla, was voted goal of the season.

Squad

Players

Players in italic left the club during the season.

Players out on loan

Transfers

In

Out

Coaching staff

Current coaching staff

Competitions

Overview

Swiss Super League

League table

Placement Progression

Results

Swiss Cup

Kickoff times are in CET

Pre-season and friendlies

Statistics
Goalscorers
{| class="wikitable" style="text-align:center"
|-
!width=15|
!width=15|
!width=15|
!width=15|
!width=145|Name
!width=80|League
!width=80|Cup
!width=80|Total
|-
!rowspan=1|1
|17
|FW
|
|align=left|Kaly Sène
|10
|0
|10
|-
!rowspan=2|2
|40
|MF
|
|align=left|Hayao Kawabe
|7
|0
|7
|-
|11
|FW
|
|align=left|Léo Bonatini
|7
|0
|7
|-
!rowspan=1|4
|59
|FW
|
|align=left|Francis Momoh
|4
|1
|5
|-
!rowspan=2|5
|33
|DF
|
|align=left|Georg Margreitter
|4
|0
|4
|-
|77
|DF
|
|align=left|Bendegúz Bolla
|4
|0
|4
|-
!rowspan=3|7
|19
|FW
|
|align=left|Leonardo Campana
|3
|0
|3
|-
|28
|MF
|
|align=left|Christián Herc
|3
|0
|3
|-
|22
|MF
|
|align=left|Giotto Morandi
|2
|0
|2
|-
!rowspan=2|9
|29
|MF
|
|align=left|Djibril Diani
|2
|0
|2
|-
|34
|DF
|
|align=left|Allan Arigoni
|2
|0
|2
|-
!rowspan=9|10
|7
|MF
|
|align=left|Nuno da Silva
|0
|1
|1
|-
|8
|MF
|
|align=left|André Santos
|0
|1
|1
|-
|9
|FW
|
|align=left|Shkelqim Demhasaj
|0
|1
|1
|-
|10
|MF
|
|align=left|Petar Pusic
|1
|0
|1
|-
|23
|MF
|
|align=left|Nikola Gjorgjev
|0
|1
|1
|-
|24
|DF
|
|align=left|Toti
|1
|0
|1
|-
|31
|DF
|
|align=left|Dominik Schmid
|1
|0
|1
|-
|41
|DF
|
|align=left|Noah Loosli
|1
|0
|1
|-
|94
|FW
|
|align=left|Brayan Riascos
|1
|0
|1
|- class="sortbottom"
|colspan=5|Own goals
|5
|0
|1
|-
|colspan=5|Totals
|54
|5
|59

Players in italic left the club during the season. 
Assists
{| class="wikitable" style="text-align:center"
|-
!width=15|
!width=15|
!width=15|
!width=15|
!width=145|Name
!width=80|League
!width=80|Cup
!width=80|Total
|-
!rowspan=1|1
|3
|DF
|
|align=left|Ermir Lenjani
|8
|0
|8
|-
!rowspan=1|2
|31
|DF
|
|align=left|Dominik Schmid
|6
|1
|7
|-
!rowspan=1|3
|28
|MF
|
|align=left|Christián Herc
|5
|0
|5
|-
!rowspan=2|4
|11
|FW
|
|align=left|Léo Bonatini
|4
|0
|4
|-
|17
|FW
|
|align=left|Kaly Sène
|4
|0
|4
|-
!rowspan=5|6
|10
|MF
|
|align=left|Petar Pusic
|3
|0
|3
|-
|59
|FW
|
|align=left|Francis Momoh
|3
|0
|3
|-
|77
|DF
|
|align=left|Bendegúz Bolla
|3
|0
|3
|-
|40
|MF
|
|align=left|Hayao Kawabe
|3
|0
|3
|-
|34
|DF
|
|align=left|Allan Arigoni
|3
|0
|3
|-
!rowspan=7|11
|4
|DF
|
|align=left|Li Lei
|1
|0
|1
|-
|6
|MF
|
|align=left|Amir Abrashi
|1
|0
|1
|-
|7
|MF
|
|align=left|Nuno da Silva
|0
|1
|1
|-
|9
|FW
|
|align=left|Shkelqim Demhasaj
|1
|0
|1
|-
|20
|MF
|
|align=left|Bruno Jordão
|1
|0
|1
|-
|22
|MF
|
|align=left|Giotto Morandi
|1
|0
|1
|-
|29
|MF
|
|align=left|Djibril Diani
|0
|1
|1
|-
|colspan=5|Totals
|45
|3
|48

Players in italic left the club during the season.

Notes

References

External links

Grasshopper Club Zürich seasons
Grasshoppers